= E-bible =

Sometimes known as document bibles or transaction deal bibles, e-bibles are a means of storing, indexing and comprehensively searching large volumes of documents related to any corporate transaction.

They are commonly used by Legal firms to collate documents from a certain case in order to store or give to a client at the end of a project. e-bibles are a means of storing complex legal folders which were usually kept in hard copy.

In 2009, Proposals were put in place in order to standardise the creation of e-bibles throughout the legal industry.

There are few suppliers of COTS solutions, however Diskbuilder and Ideagen (formerly Capgen) are notable exceptions.
